The 2023 season will be the Philadelphia Eagles' upcoming 91st season in the National Football League and their third under head coach Nick Sirianni. The Eagles will enter the season as defending NFC Champions. They will also attempt to improve upon their 14-3 record from the previous year and defend their NFC East title, something no NFC East team has done in 18 years.

Roster changes

Free agents

Signings

Departures

Draft

Staff

Current roster

Preseason
The Eagles' preseason opponents and schedule will be announced in the spring.

Regular season

2023 opponents
Listed below are the Eagles' opponents for 2023. Exact dates and times will be announced in the spring.

References

External links
 

Philadelphia
Philadelphia Eagles seasons
Philadelphia Eagles